Featherbed Top is an open, flat-topped hill,  high, in the Peak District in the county of Derbyshire in England.

Description 
Featherbed Top is a bare, domed summit covered by peat moorland. It is one of the highest hills in the Peak District. The surrounding moorland is known as Featherbed Moss, but this should not be confused with the hill of the same name about  further north.

References 

Mountains and hills of the Peak District
Mountains and hills of Derbyshire
Moorlands of England